Wickham was an electoral district of the Legislative Assembly in the Australian state of Queensland from 1873 to 1878.

Wickham was a single-member constituency which arose from the break-up of the three-member constituency of Town of Brisbane. It lasted for only one Parliament, as it was merged in 1878 with Brisbane City to create the two-member constituency of North Brisbane.

Members for Wickham

See also
 Electoral districts of Queensland
 Members of the Queensland Legislative Assembly by year
 :Category:Members of the Queensland Legislative Assembly by name

References

Former electoral districts of Queensland